Homo Twist was a Polish rock band founded in 1993 by Maciej Maleńczuk.

Discography

References

Polish musical groups